The 1999 Hong Kong District Council elections were held on 28 November 1999 for all 18 districts of Hong Kong, for 390 members from directly elected constituencies out of total 519 council members. It was the first District Council election after the handover of Hong Kong in 1997, replacing the existing Provisional District Councils appointed by Chief Executive Tung Chee-hwa.

The pro-Beijing camp scored fairly well in the election, with the flagship pro-Beijing party, the Democratic Alliance for the Betterment of Hong Kong (DAB), improved its performance in catching up with the Democratic Party, the largest pro-democracy party. The Democratic Party sustained its political momentum by securing 24.9 per cent of the votes as compared to 22.8 per cent in 1994. The DAB and the Democratic Party became the largest parties in the District Councils, while DAB captured 83 seats out of 176 candidates, the Democratic Party captured 86 out of 173 candidates. The pro-grassroots pro-democracy party, the Association for Democracy and People's Livelihood (ADPL), appeared to lose some popular support from 7 per cent of the total vote in 1994 to 4.7 per cent in 1999.

Overall, the pro-democracy forces failed to enhance their influence and outperform the pro-Beijing camp. After the election, Tung Chee-hwa reintroduced appointed members to the District Councils, appointing 102 pro-government members to prevent the pro-democracy camp from dominating the councils.

Overview
In comparison to the 1994 District Board elections, the pro-Beijing camp improved their performance and closed the gap with the pro-democracy camp. Although the Democratic Party maintained its share of votes, its success rate decline slightly due to the fct the party nominated far more candidates than it had in the 1994 elections. The Democratic Party contested directly with the Democratic Alliance for the Betterment of Hong Kong (DAB), the pro-Beijing party, in 96 constituencies, of which 54 were won by the Democrats, 36 by the DAB contenders and 6 by other candidates. Incumbents changing their constituencies such as Stanley Ng Wing-fai in Yau Tsim Mong District and Shirley Ho Suk-ping in the Sha Tin District were defeated by the pro-Beijing candidates.

Other pro-democracy parties such as the 123 Democratic Alliance and the Association for Democracy and People's Livelihood (ADPL) failed to achieve any breakthrough in elections. The 123 Democratic Alliance increased both its success rate and the number of candidates, but only winning 6 seats. It remained a small party and was eventually dissolved in 2000 due to the lack of financial support from the Taiwan government. The ADPL filled less candidates partly due to some ADPL defecting to the Democratic Party in 1997 after the internal dispute over the question of joining the Beijing-controlled Provisional Legislative Council. The ADPL failed to penetrate into other districts apart from its political base at Shamshuipo. The Frontier and the Citizens Party remained uninterested in the local elections, with the Frontier nominated only 9 candidates to compete in Sha Tin and Eastern districts, of which 4 of them were elected. The Citizens Party had only Chan Tim-shing elected in the Eastern District.

The pro-Beijing camp relied on the DAB to counter the pro-democracy forces. The DAB drastically increased its numbers of candidates from 83 in 1994 to 176 in 1999. Its success rate also rose from 44.6 per cent to 47.2 per cent, contributed by the strong grassroots work of the DAB candidates. The pro-business Liberal Party improved its performance by lower its candidates form 89 to 34, with success rate rising from 20.2 to 44.1 per cent. The Liberal Party recruited some candidates with strong grassroots networks prior the elections to compensate its weakness in district works. The party leaders, such as Chairman James Tien Pei-chun, legislators Selina Chow Liang Shuk-yee and Howard Young also contested in the elections, though Chow was defeated. The Hong Kong Progressive Alliance (PA) strategically merged with the Liberal Democratic Federation of Hong Kong (LDF), nominating fewer candidates and improving its performance by winning 16 as compared to 12 in 1994. The stronghold of PA remained in the Kowloon City District, with the expansion of its influence to Sai Kung and Sha Tin districts. The Shatin-based Civil Force slightly increased its number of seats but saw a decline in its success rate.

Results

General outcome

|-
! style="background-color:#E9E9E9;text-align:center;" colspan=3 |Political Affiliation
! style="background-color:#E9E9E9;text-align:right;" |Popular vote
! style="background-color:#E9E9E9;text-align:right;" |%
! style="background-color:#E9E9E9;text-align:right;" |%±
! style="background-color:#E9E9E9;text-align:right;" |Standing
! style="background-color:#E9E9E9;text-align:right;" |Elected
! style="background-color:#E9E9E9;text-align:right;" |±
|-
| style="background-color:Pink;border-bottom-style:hidden;" rowspan="8" |
| width=1px style="background-color: " |
| style="text-align:left;" |Democratic Alliance for the Betterment of Hong Kong
|190,792 || 23.53 || 11.82 || 176 || 83 || 27
|-
| width=1px style="background-color: " |
| style="text-align:left;" |Hong Kong Progressive Alliance
| 23,168 || 2.86 || 1.33 || 25 || 16 || 1
|-
| width=1px style="background-color: " |
| style="text-align:left;" |Liberal Party
| 27,718 || 3.42 || 3.98 || 34 || 15 || 3
|-
| width=1px style="background-color: " |
| style="text-align:left;" |Civil Force
|19,633	|| 2.42 || 0.65 || 14 || 11 || 2
|-
| width=1px style="background-color: " |
| style="text-align:left;" |Hong Kong Federation of Trade Unions
|1,074 || 0.13 || - || 1 || 1 || 1
|-
|style="background-color: "|
| style="text-align:left;" | New Territories Heung Yee Kuk
|942 || 0.12 || - || 1 || 1 || 0
|-
|style="background-color: "|
| style="text-align:left;" | Hong Kong Chinese Reform Association
| - || - || - || 1 || 1 || 0
|-
| width=1px style="background-color: " |
| style="text-align:left;" | Independent and others
| 177,774 || 21.92 || - || 180 || 104 || 4
|- style="background-color:Pink"
| colspan=3 style="text-align:left;" | Total for pro-Beijing camp || 443,441 || 54.69|| - || 436 || 232 || 22
|-
| style="background-color:LightGreen;border-bottom-style:hidden;" rowspan="8"|
| width=1px style="background-color: " |
| style="text-align:left;" |Democratic Party
|201,461 || 24.85 || 1.69 || 173 || 86 || 13
|-
| width=1px style="background-color: " |
| style="text-align:left;" |Hong Kong Association for Democracy and People's Livelihood
|38,119	|| 4.70 || 2.25 || 32 || 19 || 1
|-
| width=1px style="background-color: " |
| style="text-align:left;" |123 Democratic Alliance
|11,396	|| 1.41 || 0.60 || 10 || 6 || 0
|-
|style="background-color: "|
| style="text-align:left;" |Frontier
|9,388 || 1.16 || - || 9 || 4 || 1
|-
| width=1px style="background-color: " |
| style="text-align:left;" |Neighbourhood and Worker's Service Centre
|3,295 || 0.41 || - || 3 || 2 || 0
|-
| width=1px style="background-color: " |
| style="text-align:left;" |Citizens Party
|2,072 || 0.26 || - || 1 || 1 || 0
|-
| width=1px style="background-color: " |
| style="text-align:left;" |Hong Kong Democratic Foundation
|1,392 || 0.17 || 0.42 || 1 || 1 || 0
|-
| width=1px style="background-color: " |
| style="text-align:left;" | Independent democrats
| 58,706 || 7.24 || - || 54 || 38 || 7
|- style="background-color:LightGreen"
| colspan=3 style="text-align:left;" | Total for pro-democracy camp || 325,829 || 40.18 || - || 283 || 157 || 22
|- style="background-color:#DDDDDD;"
| colspan=3 style="text-align:left;" |Independent and others
| 41,593 || 5.13 || - || 79 || 1 || 0
|-
|style="text-align:left;background-color:#E9E9E9" colspan="3"|Total (turnout 35.82%)
|width="75" style="text-align:right;background-color:#E9E9E9"|810,863
|width="30" style="text-align:right;background-color:#E9E9E9"|100.0
|style="text-align:right;background-color:#E9E9E9"|-
|style="text-align:right;background-color:#E9E9E9"|798
|style="text-align:right;background-color:#E9E9E9"|390
|style="text-align:right;background-color:#E9E9E9"|44
|}
Note1: The total seats of the District Councils are 519 including 27 ex-officio members (Rural Committee Chairmen in the New Territories), and 102 members appointed members by the Chief Executive of Hong Kong.Note2: Councilor Lau Kong-wah who ran under both DAB and Civil Force banners is counted as a DAB member in this chart.

Results by district

Vote summary

Seat summary

Aftermath
Tung Chee-hwa appointed 102 members to the District Council after the election to prevent the pro-democracy camp from dominating the District Councils. These included 41 from various political parties, namely the Liberal Party, the Democratic Alliance for the Betterment of Hong Kong, and the Hong Kong Progressive Alliance. There were no democrats appointed. The pro-democrats thus lost their domination of the Kwun Tong, Wong Tai Sin and Yau Tsim Mong District Councils where the pro-democrats had 15, 11 and 6 directly elected seats while pro-Beijing camp gained 15, 10 and 6 seats and 18, 14 and 8 seats after the appointments respectively.

References

 
1999 elections in Asia
1999 elections in China
1999 in Hong Kong
1999
November 1999 events in Asia